General Taboada Department is a department of Argentina in Santiago del Estero Province. The capital city of the department is situated in Añatuya.

Municipalities 
The department comprises the following municipalities:

 Añatuya
 Averías
 Estación Tacañitas
 Los Juríes
 Tomas Young

References

Departments of Santiago del Estero Province